The 1925 Copa del Rey Final was the 25th final of the Spanish cup competition, the Copa del Rey. The final was played at Reina Victoria, in Seville, on May 10, 1925. Barcelona beat Arenas 2–0 to win their sixth title.

Match details 

|valign="top" width="50%"|

|}

References

1925
Copa
FC Barcelona matches
Arenas Club de Getxo matches
Sports competitions in Seville
20th century in Seville